The 1967 NBA World Championship Series was the championship series of the 1966–67 National Basketball Association (NBA) season, and was the conclusion of the 1967 NBA Playoffs. The best-of-seven series was played between the Western Conference champion San Francisco Warriors and the Eastern Conference champion Philadelphia 76ers. This was the first championship series in 11 years without the Boston Celtics, who were defeated in the Division Finals by Philadelphia, the first time since 1958 and the only time in the 1960s that the Boston Celtics did not win the NBA Finals.

Despite dominating the regular season with a 68–13 record (the most regular season wins in NBA history at the time) the 76ers did not have an easy time of it against the Warriors. Ultimately, the 76ers won the series over the Warriors, 4–2.

Series summary

76ers win series 4–2
* denotes overtime

Team rosters

Philadelphia 76ers

San Francisco Warriors

See also
 1967 NBA Playoffs
 1966–67 NBA season

References

External links

NBA History

National Basketball Association Finals
NBA
NBA
Finals
Basketball competitions in Philadelphia
Basketball competitions in San Francisco
April 1967 sports events in the United States
1960s in Philadelphia
1967 in San Francisco
1967 in sports in Pennsylvania
NBA Fin